Le Mans 24 Hours is a video game released for the PlayStation, Game Boy Color, Dreamcast, PlayStation 2, and Microsoft Windows (in two versions of the latter, one developed by Eutechnyx, like with the PlayStation version and the second version being a port of the Melbourne House version ported by Torus Games). The Dreamcast version was ported and published by Sega in Japan on 15 March 2001, while the PlayStation 2 version was ported and published by the same company on 13 June. Based on the famous 24 hours of Le Mans race in France, the player is invited to race the entire 24-hour endurance course or take part in a simpler arcade mode. The game also featured tracks such as Bugatti Circuit, Brno Circuit, Road Atlanta, Suzuka Circuit, Donington Park and Circuit de Catalunya, as well as a weather and night system.

Reception

The Dreamcast version received "universal acclaim", and the PlayStation 2 version received "generally favourable reviews", while the PC version of Le Mans 24 Hours received "mixed" reviews, according to the review aggregation website Metacritic. Chris Charla of NextGen said of the Dreamcast version in its January 2001 issue, "It's no hardcore sim, but it may be the best reproduction of the actual feel of marathon racing ever." Ten issues later, however, Gary Whitta said of the PlayStation 2 version, "While Le Mans 24 Hours has the chops to keep circuit-based racing fans satisfied for more than a few laps, it's nothing new."

Cheat Monkey of GamePro said of the PlayStation version, "You've seen better from the Test Drive series, but hardcore racing fans might want to give Le Mans a try--that is when they've totally played out their copies of Gran Turismo or Need for Speed." Four-Eyed Dragon later said of the PlayStation 2 version, "The visuals and sound are the major sore spots of Le Mans. The graphics are grainy and not very sharp, especially when you're driving at night or in the rain. The soundtrack consists of poor crowd noises and out-of-tune music. Sadly, even the solid controls can't save Le Mans from straying off course."

Lupos of GameZone gave the PC version of Test Drive Le Mans six out of ten, saying, "I think if you are an avid fan of Le Mans, you will enjoy this game. It's not terrible. It's stable. You could probably get the steering wheel to work after a couple emails to Infogrames. You will enjoy doing the 24 hour challenges, racing against authentic teams and drivers, driving the authentic cars, and figuring out the handling on them. But if you just want to play a racing game that has the best physics engine, best graphics, and supports multiplayer, this isn't it." Later, Rita Courtney gave the Dreamcast version seven out of ten, saying, "This isn't a game that you will get tired of in a hurry! I think the instruction booklet could have had a few more details, but other than that it's a great game and a lot of fun!" Kevin Krause gave the PlayStation 2 version 7.8 out of 10, saying, "Overall, Le Mans 24 Hours is entertaining and possibly worth purchasing if you're looking for something a little different than most racing titles. Don't think that it comes without flaw though because it doesn't - it could definitely use some refinement in a few areas." Later, Ovaldog gave the PC version of Le Mans 24 Hours 7.5 out of 10, calling it "a very solid performer that should provide the race fan [with] many hours of racing action."

Nick Woods of AllGame gave the PC version of Test Drive Le Mans four stars out of five, saying, "When all is said and done, Test Drive Le Mans is still a very fun, detailed game that will live up to the standards of racing game fans and critics alike." He later gave the Game Boy Color version three-and-a-half stars out of five, saying, "Taking the good and the bad into account, Test Drive Le Mans ends up being a worthwhile purchase. Game Boy Color owners probably won't find a more gripping racing game for their format." Bryan Melville, however, gave the PlayStation version two-and-a-half stars out of five, calling it "another sub par game in the series."

X-Play gave the Dreamcast version all five stars, saying, "In all, Test Drive Le Mans is the best racing game on the platform, and one of the best of the genre. The low price only helps to make it a must-buy, and there's more than enough game to satisfy any racing fan's hunger. So put on a fresh pot of coffee, get comfortable, and prepare to spend the most time you ever have in a single race." Edge gave the same console version a score of seven out of ten, saying, "an exceptional multiplayer option [...] combined with a massively satisfying singular experience go a long way to remedy the curtailing price of the official license."

The Dreamcast version won the award for "Best Driving Game" at GameSpots Best and Worst of 2000 Awards, and was nominated in the "Best Game No One Played" category. The staff argued that the game was "a victim of the Test Drive name, as the Test Drive series is well known for producing large quantities of mediocre driving games—gamers just assumed Le Mans was more of the same."

The PlayStation 2 version was nominated for The Electric Playgrounds 2001 Blister Awards for "Best Console Driving Game", but lost to Grand Theft Auto III.

Notes

References

External links

Le Mans
1999 video games
24 Hours of Le Mans
Dreamcast games
Eutechnyx games
Game Boy Color games
Infogrames games
Multiplayer and single-player video games
PlayStation (console) games
PlayStation 2 games
Video games developed in Australia
Video games developed in France
Video games developed in the United Kingdom
Windows games